California's involvement in the American Civil War included sending gold east to support the war effort, recruiting volunteer combat units to replace regular U.S. Army units sent east, in the area west of the Rocky Mountains, maintaining and building numerous camps and fortifications, suppressing secessionist activity (many of these secessionists went east to fight for the Confederacy) and securing the New Mexico Territory against the Confederacy. The State of California did not send its units east, but many citizens traveled east and joined the Union Army there, some of whom became famous.

Democrats had dominated the state from its inception, and Southern Democrats were sympathetic to secession. Although they were a minority in the state, they had become a majority in Southern California and Tulare County, and large numbers resided in San Joaquin, Santa Clara, Monterey, and San Francisco counties. California was home for powerful businessmen who played a significant role in Californian politics through their control of mines, shipping, finance, and the Republican Party but Republicans had been  a minority party until the secession crisis.  The Civil War split in the Democratic Party allowed Abraham Lincoln to carry the state, albeit by only a slim margin. Unlike most free states, Lincoln won California with only a plurality as opposed to the outright majority in the popular vote.

In the beginning of 1861, as the secession crisis began, the secessionists in San Francisco made an attempt to separate the state and Oregon from the union, which failed. Southern California, with a majority of discontented Californios and Southern secessionists, had already voted for a separate Territorial government and formed militia units, but were kept from secession after the outbreak of war by Federal troops drawn from the frontier forts of the District of Oregon and District of California (primarily Fort Tejon and Fort Mojave).

Patriotic fervor swept California after the attack on Fort Sumter, providing the manpower for Volunteer Regiments recruited mainly from the pro-Union counties in the north of the State. Gold was also provided to support the Union. When the Democratic party split over the war, Republican supporters of Lincoln took control of the state in the September elections. Volunteer Regiments were sent to occupy pro-secessionist Southern California and Tulare County, leaving them generally powerless during the war itself. However some Southerners traveled east to join the Confederate Army, evading Union patrols and hostile Apache. Others remaining in the state attempted to outfit a privateer to prey on coastal shipping, and late in the war two groups of partisan rangers were formed but neither were successful.

From statehood to the Civil War
When California was admitted as a state under the Compromise of 1850, Californians had already decided it was to be a free state—the constitutional convention of 1849 unanimously abolished slavery. As a result, Southerners in Congress voted against admission in 1850 while Northerners pushed it through, pointing to its population of 93,000 and its vast wealth in gold. Northern California, which was dominated by mining, shipping, and commercial elites of San Francisco, favored becoming a state.

In the 1856 presidential election, California gave its electoral votes to the winner, James Buchanan.

Southern California's attempts at secession from California
Following California's admission to the Union, Californios (dissatisfied with inequitable taxes and land laws) and pro-slavery Southerners in lightly populated, rural Southern California attempted three times in the 1850s to achieve a separate statehood or territorial status from Northern California. The last attempt, the Pico Act of 1859, was passed by the California State Legislature, signed by the State governor John B. Weller, approved overwhelmingly by voters in the proposed Territory of Colorado and sent to Washington, D.C., with a strong advocate in Senator Milton Latham. However the secession crisis following the election of Lincoln in 1860 led to the proposal never coming to a vote.

Secession crisis in California
In 1860 California gave a small plurality of 38,733 votes to Abraham Lincoln, whose 32% of the total vote was enough to win all its electoral votes; 68% voted for the other three candidates.

Conspiracy to form a Pacific Republic
During the secession crisis following Lincoln's election, Federal troops were under the command of Colonel (Brevet Brigadier General) Albert Sidney Johnston, in Benicia, headquarters of the Department of the Pacific. General Johnston strongly believed in the Southern right to secede but regretted that it was occurring. A group of Southern sympathizers in the state made plans to secede with Oregon to form a "Pacific Republic". The success of their plans rested on the cooperation of General Johnston. Johnston met with some of these Southern men, but before they could propose anything to him he told them that he had heard rumors of an attempt to seize the San Francisco forts and arsenal at Benicia, that he had prepared for that and would defend the facilities under his command with all his resources and to the last drop of his blood. He told them to tell this to their Southern friends. 

Meanwhile, Union men feared Johnston would aid such a plot and communicated their fears to Washington asking for his replacement. Brig. Gen. Edwin Vose Sumner was soon sent west via Panama to replace Johnston in May 1861. Johnston resigned his commission on May 31, and after Sumner arrived turned over his command and moved with his family to Los Angeles. He would soon travel with other Southerners across New Mexico Territory to Texas and become commander of the Confederacy's western armies. He died at the Battle of Shiloh.

Struggle for control of the militia
As the secession crisis developed in early 1861, several Volunteer Companies of the California Militia had disbanded because of divided loyalties and new pro-Union ones were sworn in across the state under the supervision of County sheriffs and judges. Many of these units saw no action but some were to form the companies of the earliest California Volunteer regiments. Others like the Petaluma Guard and Emmet Rifles in Sonoma County suppressed a secessionist disturbance in Healdsburg, in 1862. Union commanders relied on the San Bernardino Mounted Rifles and their Captain Clarence E. Bennett for intelligence and help to hold the pro-Southern San Bernardino County for the Union in late 1861 as Federal troops were being withdrawn and replaced by California Volunteers.

Secessionist militias
Notable as the only successfully formed pro-Southern militia unit, the Los Angeles Mounted Rifles was organized on March 7, 1861, in Los Angeles County. It included more than a few Californios in its leadership and its ranks, including the County Sheriff Tomas Avila Sanchez. Its leader was one of his Undersheriffs Alonzo Ridley and included several of his deputies.

A. J. King, another Undersheriff of Los Angeles County (and former member of the earlier "Monte Rangers"), and other influential men in El Monte, formed another secessionist militia, the Monte Mounted Rifles on March 23, 1861. However, A. J. King soon ran afoul of Federal authorities. According to the Sacramento Union of April 30, 1861, King was brought before Colonel Carleton and was made to take an oath of allegiance to the Union and was then released. On April 26, 1861, the Monte Mounted Rifles had asked Governor Downey for arms. The governor sent the arms, but army officers at San Pedro held them up, preventing the activation of the Monte Mounted Rifles.

On March 28, 1861, the newly formed Arizona Territory voted to separate from New Mexico Territory and join the Confederacy. This had increased Union officials' fears of a secessionist design to separate Southern California from the state and join the Confederacy. This fear was based on the demonstrated desire for separation in the vote for the Pico Act, the strength of secessionists in the area and their declared intentions and activities, especially in forming militia companies.

Outbreak of the Civil War

Reaction to the outbreak of war in California
At the outbreak of the Civil War, Southern California secession seemed possible; the populace was largely in favor of it, militias with secessionist sympathies had been formed, and Bear Flags, the banner of the Bear Flag Revolt, had been flown for several months by secessionists in Los Angeles and San Bernardino counties. After word of the Battle of Fort Sumter reached California, there were public demonstrations by secessionists. However secession quickly became impossible when three companies of Federal cavalry were moved from Fort Mojave and Fort Tejon into Los Angeles in May and June 1861.

Suspected by local Union authorities, General Johnston evaded arrest and with Lewis Armistead joined the Los Angeles Mounted Rifles as a private. Leaving Warner's Ranch on May 27, they journeyed across the southwestern deserts to Texas, crossing the Colorado River into the Confederate Territory of Arizona, on July 4, 1861. The Los Angeles Mounted Rifles disbanded and members joined the Confederate Army shortly after they reached the Confederate Arizona Territorial capital of Mesilla (in what was then part of the United States' New Mexico Territory and is now New Mexico). Like other pro-Confederates leaving California for the Confederacy, the Rifles joined up principally with Texas regiments. However General Johnston joined the fight in the east as a general with the Confederacy and was later killed leading their army at the Battle of Shiloh. Armistead died leading Pickett's Charge at the Battle of Gettysburg.

The only capture of a Confederate flag in California during the Civil War took place on July 4, 1861, in Sacramento. During Independence Day celebrations, secessionist Major George P. Gilliss, an engineer and Mexican War veteran, celebrated the independence of the United States from Britain as well as the southern states from the Union. He unfurled a Confederate flag of his own design and proceeded to march down the street to both the applause and jeers of onlookers. Jack Biderman and Curtis Clark, enraged by Gilliss' actions, accosted him and "captured" the flag. The flag itself is based on the First National flag of the Confederacy, the Stars and Bars. However, the canton contains seventeen stars rather than the Confederate's seven. Because the flag was captured by Jack Biderman, it is often also referred to as the "Biderman Flag".

California volunteers called up
California (along with Oregon and Kansas) was not included in the initial callup of 75,000 militia due to its vast distance from the rest of the country. It was only later, as he was recalling Federal troops to the east, on July 24, 1861, the Secretary of War called on Governor John G. Downey to furnish one regiment of infantry and five companies of cavalry to guard the overland mail route from Carson City to Salt Lake City. Three weeks later four more regiments of infantry and a regiment of cavalry were requested. All of these were volunteer units recruited and organized in the counties of the northern part of the state, especially around San Francisco Bay region and the mining camps in counties in the foothills of the Sierra Nevada Mountains; few recruits came from the counties of Southern California. These volunteers replaced the regular troops transferred to the east before the end of 1861.

Turmoil in Southern California
Charged with all the supervision of Los Angeles, San Bernardino, San Diego, and Santa Barbara Counties, on August 14, 1861, Major William Scott Ketchum steamed from San Francisco to San Pedro and made a rapid march to encamp near San Bernardino on August 26 and with Companies D and G of the 4th Infantry Regiment later reinforced at the beginning of September by a detachment of ninety First U.S. Dragoons and a howitzer. Except for frequent sniping at his camp, Ketchum's garrison stifled any secessionist uprising from Belleville and a show of force by the Dragoons in the streets of San Bernardino at the end of election day quelled a secessionist political demonstration during the September gubernatorial elections in San Bernardino County.

Thereafter, with the Democrats split over the war, the first Republican governor of California, Leland Stanford, was elected on September 4, 1861.

Following the elections on September 7, there was a gunfight resulting from a robbery of travelers to Bear Valley and Holcomb Valley on the pack trail in the Upper Santa Ana Canyon where the Santa Ana River runs out of the San Bernardino Mountains. It was suspected by Union men that secessionists had been the culprits, doing the robbery as part of a larger plan of robberies in the valleys of Los Angeles and San Bernardino Counties. However, no such plan materialized.

Civil War conflicts within California

Securing Southern California
As the California Volunteer regiments formed, some were sent south with Colonel George Wright, commanding officer of the District of Southern California. He was to replace the Federal troops in Los Angeles, gathered there to prevent a rising by the numerous secessionist sympathizers in Southern California. In October 1861, Wright was promoted to Brigadier General of Volunteers and placed in command of the Department of the Pacific, replacing Sumner who had recommended Wright as his replacement. Colonel James Henry Carleton of the 1st California Volunteer Infantry Regiment replaced Wright as commander in the south. Detachments were soon sent out by Carleton to San Bernardino and San Diego Counties to secure them for the Union and prevent the movement of men, horses and weapons eastward to the Confederacy.

One of the earliest conflicts related to the Civil War in California occurred on November 29, 1861, at Minter Ranch, in the hills just south and west of the San Jose Valley, where Warner's Ranch and the military post of Camp Wright was located. Dan Showalter's party of secessionists, like some others, were attempting to avoid the post and make their way across the desert to join the Confederate Army in Texas. They were pursued from Temecula by a Volunteer Cavalry patrol from the camp, intercepted and captured without shots being fired. Later after being imprisoned at Fort Yuma, Showalter and the others were released after swearing loyalty to the Union, but they made their way to the Confederacy later.

New Camp Carleton was established on March 22, 1862, near El Monte; its garrison was to keep an eye on that hotbed of secessionist sympathies. On April 10, 1862, as the United States Marshal for Southern California, Henry D. Barrows, wrote to the commander of Union Army Department of the Pacific in San Francisco, complaining of anti-Union sentiment in Southern California. The letter says such sentiment "permeates society here among both the high and the low," and reports:

A. J. King, under-sheriff of this county, who has been a bitter secessionist, who said to me that he owed no allegiance to the United States Government; that Jeff Davis's was the only constitutional government we had, and that he remained here because he could do more harm to the enemies of that Government by staying here than going there; brought down on the Senator (a steam ship) Tuesday last a large lithograph gilt-framed portrait of Beauregard, the rebel general, which he flaunted before a large crowd at the hotel when he arrived. I induced Colonel Carleton to have him arrested as one of the many dangerous secessionists living in our midst, and to-day he was taken to Camp Drum. He was accompanied by General Volney E. Howard as counsel, and I have but little hope that he will be retained in custody.

Naval incidents
During and after the 1862 Confederate New Mexico Campaign, no rising against Union control occurred in the state. However, in the following years some attempts were made by the Confederate navy to seize gold and silver for the Confederacy.

J. M. Chapman plot
In 1863, Asbury Harpending, after traveling secretly to Richmond to obtain a letter of marque, joined with other California members of the Knights of the Golden Circle in San Francisco to outfit the schooner J. M. Chapman as a Confederate privateer in San Francisco Bay. Their object was to raid commerce on the Pacific coast carrying gold and silver shipments, to capture and carry it back to support the Confederacy.

Salvador pirates
In spring of 1864, the Confederate navy ordered Captain Thomas Egenton Hogg and his command to take passage on board a coastal steamer in Panama City, seize her on the high seas, arm her and attack the Pacific Mail steamers and the whalers in the North Pacific. In Havana, the American consul, Thomas Savage, learned about this conspiracy, and notified Rear Admiral George F. Pearson at Panama City. The Admiral had the passengers boarding the steamers at Panama City watched and when Hogg's command was found aboard the Panama Railroad steamer Salvador, a force from the  arrested them and brought them to San Francisco. Tried by a military commission, they were sentenced to be hanged, but General Irvin McDowell commuted their sentences. To prevent any further attempts to seize Pacific coast shipping, General McDowell ordered each passenger on board American merchant steamers to surrender all weapons when boarding the ship and every passenger and his baggage was searched. All officers were armed for the protection of their ships.

Partisan Rangers in California
Late in the war, local secessionists in California made attempts to seize gold and silver for the Confederacy. In early 1864, Rufus Henry Ingram, formerly with Quantrill's Raiders, arrived in Santa Clara County and with Tom Poole (formerly a member of the crew of the J. M. Chapman), organized local Knights of the Golden Circle and commanded them in what became known as Captain Ingram's Partisan Rangers. In the Bullion Bend Robbery they robbed two stagecoaches near Placerville of their silver and gold, leaving a letter explaining they were not bandits but carrying out a military operation to raise funds for the Confederacy.

Also in early 1864, secessionist Judge George Gordon Belt, a rancher and former alcalde in Stockton, organized a group of partisan rangers including John Mason and "Jim Henry" and sent them out to recruit more men and pillage the property of Union men in the countryside. For the next two years the Mason Henry Gang, as they became known, posed as Confederate partisan rangers but acted as outlaws, committing robberies, thefts and murders in the southern San Joaquin Valley, Santa Cruz County, Monterey County, Santa Clara County, and in counties of Southern California. However, despite all these efforts no captured gold was sent to the Confederacy.

1864 election
In July 1864, with many Douglas Democrats having deserted their party over the war, the remaining Democrats formed a fusion party behind the former governor John G. Downey, opposed to continuation of the war, emancipation, the arrest of civilians by the military, the suppression of free speech and of the press and racial equality. The result in the September election was a second Republican governor of California, Frederick F. Low.

Lincoln won the 1864 election with almost 59% in California.

Civil War Era forts and camps in California
At this time, the U.S. had a number of military forts to defend against the Indian threat, and to solidify the U.S. claim to the state. As the conflict began, new forts and camps were founded to protect ports and communications, carry out operations against the Indians, to hold off Confederate soldiers and suppress their sympathizers.

Mustering and training camps for the California Volunteer units were organized at Camp Union south of Sacramento, Camp Sigel, near Auburn, Benicia Barracks, Camp Downy and Camp Merchant near Oakland and Camp Alert near San Francisco, Camp Lyon, Camp Sumner, and the Presidio in San Francisco.

Of the ports, San Francisco Bay was the most important; a coastal fortification at Fort Point was built at the edge of the Presidio, and another supporting installation at Fort Baker on the Marin Headlands. One Civil War-era fort, Post of Alcatraz Island or Fort Alcatraz, on a rocky island just inside the Golden Gate, later became an infamous Federal penitentiary, Alcatraz. The San Francisco Bay was also protected by the Navy at Mare Island, the Benicia Arsenal, and Fort Mason with the posts at San Francisco's Point San Jose, and Camp Reynolds on Angel Island. San Pedro was protected from January 1862 by Camp Drum, later the Drum Barracks, and later a post was established at Two Harbors on Catalina Island called Camp Santa Catalina. San Diego was only defended by a small garrison at the New San Diego Depot occupied in 1860.

In the northwest of the state were several forts, Fort Bragg on the Mendocino County coast supporting Fort Wright. Further north on the coast of Humboldt County was Fort Humboldt, established to maintain peace between the Native Americans and new settlers and Headquarters of the Humboldt Military District supporting other forts in the area. Ulysses S. Grant was briefly stationed here prior to the war. Fort Humboldt supported Camp Curtis, Fort Gaston, Camp Lyon, Fort Baker, Fort Iaqua, Fort Anderson, and Fort Seward which were the base of operations for the soldiers in the Bald Hills War. Camp Lincoln was established north of Crescent City near the Smith River to guard the native people on the Smith River Reservation from settlers and keep prisoners of war from the Bald Hills War settled there from escaping. 
 
In the Northeast were Fort Crook in Shasta County, from which patrols occasionally engaged the Pit River tribes. In Modoc County, Fort Bidwell was established in the far northwestern corner of the state in 1863 to guard against the Snake Indians.

To the south there was Fort Miller in the foothills of the southern Sierra Nevada in Fresno County, and Camp Babbitt outside the town of Visalia, in Tulare County. Fort Tejon in the Grapevine Canyon (La Cañada de las Uvas) had protected the southern San Joaquin Valley and Southern California. It had been the headquarters of the First U.S. Dragoons until those regular army troops were transferred in July 1861 upon the outbreak of war. Fort Tejon was reoccupied by California volunteer troops in 1863 to guard Paiute Indians from the Owens Valley at the nearby Sebastian Indian Reservation and then it was abandoned for good on September 11, 1864. Camp Independence was established on Oak Creek nearby modern Independence, California on July 4, 1862, during the Owens Valley Indian War.

At the beginning of the war Union authorities were worried that the large number of secessionist sympathizers in Southern California might rise in an attempt to join the Confederacy. In June 1861 troops withdrawn from Fort Tejon and Fort Mojave established Camp Fitzgerald outside Los Angeles in various locations as each proved unsuitable.
 
In late September 1861, troops from Northern California landed in San Pedro and marched to establish a new camp at a more suitable location at Camp Latham in modern Culver City. From this post Ketchum's regular soldiers were relieved on October 20 by three companies of 1st California Cavalry sent out to San Bernardino County. and establish Camp Carleton and later Camp Morris. Volunteer troops were also sent to Camp Wright in San Diego County to watch the southern overland approach to California across the Colorado Desert from Fort Yuma, located on the west bank of the Colorado River.

In March 1862, all the troops that were drilling at Camp Latham were transferred to Camp Drum, leaving a company of soldiers to observe the Los Angeles area. Following flooding at Camp Carleton, the garrison moved to New Camp Carleton, built near the secessionist hotbed of El Monte in 1862.

Civil War military units associated with California

Due to its location, the state's local militia companies remained under state status because of the great number of Southern sympathizers, the Indian threat, and possible foreign attack. The state followed the usual military practice of mustering militia companies into regiments. These Volunteers maintained military posts vacated by the regular army units that were ordered east. However a number of state militias disbanded and went east. Several of these companies offered their services and were accepted by the Union Army.

In 1862, five companies of the 2nd Massachusetts Cavalry (also known as The California 100 and the California Cavalry Battalion) were enrolled and mustered into service, and sent to Massachusetts. They left San Francisco by sea for service in the east. The California Battalion consisted of Companies A, C, F, L, and M. They participated in 51 battles, campaigns, and skirmishes.

Oregon U.S. Senator Edward D. Baker raised a regiment of men on the East Coast. These units and others were generally known as the "California Regiment", but later designated the 71st Pennsylvania Infantry. Col. Roderick N. Matheson was the leader of the 32nd New York Infantry, also known as the 1st California Regiment.

In October 1861, Colonel Baker was authorized to increase his command to a brigade. The additional regiments were commanded by Colonels Joshua T. Owen, DeWitt Clinton Baxter, and Turner G. Morehead, all from Philadelphia, respectively designated the 2nd, 3rd, and 5th California Regiments. The 4th California Regiment, as planned, was composed of artillery and cavalry. These troops were soon detached. After Baker was killed in the Battle of Ball's Bluff, Pennsylvania claimed these four infantry regiments as a part of its quota, and they became known as the "Philadelphia Brigade" of Pennsylvania Volunteers. They were initially commanded by Brig. Gen. William W. Burns and first served in John Sedgwick's Division of the II Corps, Army of the Potomac. They had a distinguished service career, highlighted by their actions at the Battle of Antietam and their prominent position in the defense against Pickett's Charge at the Battle of Gettysburg.

Military units associated with California included:
 Los Angeles Mounted Rifles (Confederate)
 Monte Mounted Rifles (Confederate)
 Captain Ingram's Partisan Rangers (Confederate)
 Mason Henry Gang (Confederate)
2nd Regiment of Cavalry, Massachusetts Volunteers Company A, E, F, L, and M (the later four called the "California Battalion")
32nd Regiment of New York Volunteers
 "Philadelphia Brigade" of Pennsylvania Volunteers
 1st California Infantry - 71st Pennsylvania Infantry
 2nd California Infantry - 69th Pennsylvania Infantry
 3rd California Infantry - 72nd Pennsylvania Infantry
 5th California Infantry - 106th Pennsylvania Infantry

Regiments of the California volunteers in federal service
The California Volunteer units recruited 15,725 volunteers for Federal service. Nearly all served inside California and in the Department of the Pacific and the Department of New Mexico. These units included two full regiments and one battalion of Native Cavalry, eight full regiments and two battalions of infantry, one of Veterans and another called Mountaineers that specialized in fighting in the mountainous Redwood forests and Bald Hills of Northwestern California. California's Volunteers conducted many operations against the native peoples within the states of California and Oregon, and in the western territories within the Departments of the Pacific and New Mexico, to secure these lands for the Union.  Some of most significant of these were the Snake War, Bald Hills War, Owens Valley Indian War, Chiricahua Wars and Carson's Campaign against the Navajo.

List of California Civil War units

The California Volunteers most directly in action against the Confederacy were known as the California Column. They were under the command of General James Carleton. At various times the following units served with the Column: 1st Regiment California Volunteer Cavalry, 1st Battalion of Native Cavalry, and the 1st, 5th and 7th Regiment California Volunteer Infantry. This force served in Arizona, New Mexico, and Texas, driving out the Confederate force in the Arizona Territory and defending New Mexico Territory and the southern overland route to California and operating against the Apache, Navajo, Comanche and other tribes.

The command composed of 2nd Regiment California Volunteer Cavalry and the 3rd Regiment California Volunteer Infantry under P. Edward Connor kept the Central Overland Route to California open. As a matter of Connor's proactive style, he led these troops to attack Shoshoni Indians at the Bear River Massacre near what is now the city of Preston, Idaho, on January 29, 1863.

Detachments from the 2nd Regiment California Volunteer Cavalry from Camp Latham under Lieutenant Colonel George S. Evans, fought in the Owens Valley Indian War, and established Camp Independence in 1862.

The 2nd, 4th, 6th, and 8th Regiment California Volunteer Infantry and the 1st Battalion California Volunteer Mountaineers provided internal security in Northern California, Oregon, and Washington Territory. 2nd and 6th Volunteer Infantry Regiments and the 1st Battalion California Volunteer Mountaineers served in the Bald Hills War and some other companies in the Snake War.

Also the 1st Regiment Washington Territory Volunteer Infantry, had eight companies that were recruited in California during 1862, for service in Washington Territory. They were mustered out at Fort Vancouver in 1865.

The navy and the Civil War in the Pacific
Pacific Squadron Operations

Past residents of California in the Civil War
The following famous people visited or lived in California before, during or after the Civil War.
Lewis Addison Armistead
Edward Dickinson Baker
Edward Fitzgerald Beale
James Henry Carleton
Mark Twain (Samuel Clemens)
Patrick Edward Connor
Ulysses S. Grant
Antonio Maria de la Guerra
William M. Gwin
John Charles Frémont
Henry Wager Halleck
Winfield Scott Hancock
Joseph Hooker
Albert Sidney Johnston
Custis Lee
Thaddeus S.C. Lowe
Roderick N. Matheson
Henry Morris Naglee
Norton I
Edward Otho Cresap Ord
William Starke Rosecrans
William Tecumseh Sherman
George Stoneman
Joseph Rodman West

See also
 California State Military Museum
 History of California through 1899

References

Further reading
 
 Carter, Bryan Anthony. "Frontier Apart: Identity, Loyalty, and the Coming of the Civil War on the Pacific Coast" (PhD. Diss. Oklahoma State University, 2014) online, with detailed bibliography
 
 
 
 
Masich, Andrew E. (2006). The Civil War in Arizona; the Story of the California Volunteers, 1861-1865 University of Oklahoma Press, Norman. 
 Matthews, Glenna. The Golden State in the Civil War: Thomas Starr King, the Republican Party, and the Birth of Modern California (Cambridge UP, 2013).
 Richards, Leonard L. The California Gold Rush and the Coming of the Civil War (2008).

Primary sources
 
 
 
The War of the Rebellion: a compilation of the official records of the Union and Confederate armies, Volume 27, Part 1, CHAPTER LXII. Operations on the Pacific Coast, January 1,1861 — June 30, 1862, United States. War Dept.
 The War of the Rebellion: Volume 35, Part 1, CORRESPONDENCE, ORDERS, AND RETURNS RELATING TO OPERATIONS ON THE PACIFIC COAST FROM JULY 1, 1862, TO JUNE 30, 1865. By United States. War Dept, Robert Nicholson Scott, Henry Martyn WASHINGTON: GOVERNMENT PRINTING OFFICE. 1897
 Records of California men in the war of the rebellion 1861 to 1867 By California. Adjutant General's Office, SACRAMENTO: State Office, J. D. Young, Supt. State Printing. 1890.

External links

United States of North America, western states, 1861
Map of California in 1860, showing County boundaries, roads
California Military Museum
Snakes in the Grass: Copperheads in Contra Costa?
San Diego in the Civil War
Copperheads, Secesh Men, and Confederate Guerillas
San Francisco in the Civil War
Civil War: How Southern California Tried to Split from Northern California - KCET

 
American Civil War
American Civil War
Pacific Coast Theater of the American Civil War
 
American Civil War
American Civil War by state